Anthony Terrell Seward Sampson (3 August 1926 – 18 December 2004) was a British writer and journalist. His most notable and successful book was Anatomy of Britain, which was published in 1962 and was followed by five more "Anatomies", updating the original book under various titles. He was the grandson of the linguist John Sampson, of whom he wrote a biography, The Scholar Gypsy: The Quest For A Family Secret (1997). He also gave Nelson Mandela advice on Mandela's famous 1964 defence speech at the trial which led to his conviction for life.

Early life and education
Sampson was born in Billingham, County Durham, and was educated at Westminster School. In 1944 he joined the Royal Navy, and by the time he left, in 1947, he was a sub-lieutenant in the RN Volunteer Reserve. He then studied English at Christ Church, Oxford.

Career
In 1951 Sampson went to Johannesburg, South Africa, to become editor of the magazine Drum, remaining there for four years. After his return to the United Kingdom, he joined the editorial staff of The Observer, where he worked from 1955 to 1966.

He was the author of a series of books, starting with Anatomy of Britain (1962), in which he explored the workings of the British state and other major social institutions, in particular the large corporation. He took an interest in broad political and economic power structures, but he also saw power as personal. He occasionally offered psychoanalytical interpretations of power players, as in this passage from The Money Lenders:"[Bankers] seem specially conscious of time, always aware that time is money. There is always a sense of restraint and tension. (Is it part of the connection which Freud observed between compulsive neatness, anal eroticism and interest in money?)"

Sampson was a personal friend of Nelson Mandela before Mandela became politically active.  In 1964 Sampson attended the Rivonia Trial in support of Mandela and other ANC leaders, and in 1999 he published the authorised biography of Mandela.

Sampson was also a founding member of the now defunct Social Democratic Party (SDP).

Sampson's personal archive, catalogued by the Bodleian Library, was made public for the first time in 2012.

Personal life
He married Sally on his return from South Africa. She was a Justice of the Peace and was a bench chairman of the Youth Court at Camberwell, London

Bibliography

Books

Drum: the Making of a Magazine. Johannesburg: Jonathan Ball Publishers, 2005. .
The Treason Cage (1958)
 Common Sense About Africa (1960)
 Anatomy of Britain (1962) online free
 Anatomy of Britain Today (1965)
 Macmillan: A Study in Ambiguity (1967)
 The New Europeans. A guide to the workings, institutions and character of contemporary Western Europe (1968)
 The New Anatomy of Britain (1971) online free
 The Sovereign State of ITT (1973)
 The Seven Sisters (a study of the international oil industry) (1974)
 Serpico (with Peter Maas) (1976)
 The Arms Bazaar (a study of the international arms trade) (1977)
 The Money Lenders (a study of international banking) (1981) 
 The Changing Anatomy of Britain (1982)
 Black Gold (a novel about the crumbling of apartheid and the business/financial picture in South Africa) (1987)
 The Midas Touch (a study of money; book and TV series) (1989,  or 0-563-20853-8 (BBC)) 
 The Essential Anatomy of Britain: Democracy in Crisis (1992) online free
 Company Man (a study of corporate life) (1995) 
 The Scholar Gypsy: The Quest for a Family Secret (1997)
 Mandela: The Authorised Biography (1999), winner of the Alan Paton Award
 Who Runs This Place?: The Anatomy of Britain in the 21st Century (2004)
 The Anatomist (his autobiography, prepared for publication by his widow and family) (2008)

Critical studies, reviews and biography
 Review of Company man.

References

External links

John Thompson, "Anthony Sampson" (obituary), The Guardian, 21 December 2004.
Anthony Sampson's resume
Catalogue of the papers of Anthony Sampson, c.1930–2011, held at the Bodleian Library, University of Oxford

1926 births
2004 deaths
20th-century non-fiction writers
Alumni of Christ Church, Oxford
British foreign policy writers
British male journalists
British non-fiction writers
Members of the Order of Luthuli
People educated at Westminster School, London
People from Billingham
Recipients of the Order of the Companions of O. R. Tambo
Royal Navy officers of World War II
Royal Naval Volunteer Reserve personnel of World War II